is a subway station on the Sendai Subway Namboku Line in Aoba-ku, Sendai, Miyagi Prefecture, Japan.

Lines

Station layout
Asahigaoka Station is an underground station with a single island platform serving two tracks.

Platforms

History
Asahigaoka Station was opened on 15 July 1987. Operations were suspended from 11 March 2011 to 29 April 2012 due to damage sustained by the 2011 Tōhoku earthquake and tsunami.

Passenger statistics
In fiscal 2015, the station was used by an average of 6,839 passengers daily.

Surrounding area
 Sendai Science Museum
 Dainohara Forest Park
 Sendai Youth Culture Center
 Sendai-Kita Post Office
 Sendai Dainohara Post Office
 Asahigaoka and Nankodai residential districts

See also
 List of railway stations in Japan

References

External links

 

Railway stations in Miyagi Prefecture
Sendai Subway Namboku Line
Railway stations in Japan opened in 1987